The 2003 UCI Cyclo-cross World Championships were held in Monopoli, Italy on Saturday February 1 and Sunday February 2, 2003.

Medal summary

Medal table

Men's Elite
 Held on Sunday February 2, 2003

Women's Elite

 Held on Sunday February 2, 2003

Men's Under 23 

 Held on Saturday February 1, 2003

Men's Under 18 

 Held on Saturday February 1, 2003

References

External links
 Sports123
 CyclingNews
 UCI Archive

UCI Cyclo-cross World Championships
World Championships
C
International cycle races hosted by Italy
UCI Cyclo-cross World Championships